Nicolas Kummert (born March 12, 1979) is a Belgian jazz singer and tenor saxophonist.

Biography 
In 2001 Kummert graduated at the Brussels conservatory with teachers Jeroen Van Herzeele and John Ruocco.  He was also taught by Fabrizio Cassol.  Kummert already won several prizes, e.g. the Golden Django for best young talent in 2003.

He has played and recorded with musicians like the Alexi Tuomarila quartet, the group of Karl Jannuska, Jef Neve's 'Groove Thing', Yves Peeters, Qu4tre and Pierre Van Dormael. He also worked with African singers like Manu Dibango and DJ's. In 2010 he released the first album with his group 'Nicolas Kummert Voices', together with Herve Samb and Nicolas Thys. They sing more poetic lyrics and recites in a setting of jazz improvisation and African grooves, funk and dubs. Among the songs are some covers, for example, of "Close to You" (the Carpenters) and "Monk's Dream" (Thelonious Monk).

Bands
 Alchimie
 Alex Tuomarila Quartet
 Namur Sax Quartet

Discography

Solo albums 
2017: La diversité (Edition Records)

With 'Nicolas Kummert Voices'
2010: One (Prova Records)
2014: Liberté (Prova Records)

Collaborations 
With 'Alexi Tuomarila Quartet'
2001: Voices Of Pohjola (Igloo)
2003: 02 (Finlandia Records, Warner Jazz)
2008: Runo X (Edita Cambayá)

With Alchimie
2001: Alchimie (Igloo)	

With 'Jef Neve Trio'
2003: Nobody Is Illegal (Universal Music Belgium)

With 'Yves Peeters Group'
2010: Sound Tracks (W.E.R.F.)
2013: All You See (W.E.R.F.)

With 'Matthieu Marthouret Organ Quartet'
2012: Upbeats (Double Moon Records)

With 'Matthieu Marthouret Organ Quartet'
2012: Upbeats (Double Moon Records)

With Viktor Lazlo
2012: My Name Is Billie Holiday (amc)

With 'Gyle Waddy
2012: Since I Fell For Youææ (The Eclectic Album, Vol. II) (Elyts Records)
	
With Drifter
2015: Flow (Edition Records)

References

External links 
 

Belgian jazz musicians
Living people
1979 births
21st-century saxophonists
Edition Records artists